Moraskhun-e Sofla (also Romanized as Morāskhūn-e Soflá) is a village in Rostam-e Seh Rural District, Sorna District, Rostam County, Fars Province, Iran. At the 2016 census, its population was 562, in 151 families.

References 

Populated places in Rostam County